Sortino (Sicilian: Sciurtinu) is a town and comune in the Province of Syracuse, Sicily (Italy). It is located in the Anapo river valley.

The Necropolis of Pantalica, part of the UNESCO World Heritage Site of "Syracuse and the Rocky Necropolis of Pantalica" is situated between Sortino and Ferla.

Main sights

Sortino has fifteen Roman Catholic churches.. The main one is the Chiesa Madre di S. Giovanni Evangelista. Others are:

Chiesa del Monastero
Chiesa di S. Sebastiano
Chiesa di S. Sofia 
Chiesa di S. Benedetto
Chiesa di S. Pietro 
Chiesa dei Cappuccini 
Chiesa del Collegio
Chiesa di S. Antonio Abate
Chiesa di S. Mauro
Chiesa della SS. Annunziata
Chiesa del Purgatorio
Chiesa del Carmine
Chiesa di S. Francesco d'Assisi
Chiesa di S. Giuseppe

Twin towns
 Riedstadt, Germany
 Murter, Croatia

References

Municipalities of the Province of Syracuse